Jake Lloyd (born 20 September 1993) is an Australian rules footballer who plays for the Sydney Swans in the Australian Football League (AFL).

Lloyd grew up in Horsham, Victoria and won four straight senior flags with his home club the Horsham Demons, the first of which came when he was a 16-year-old. Lloyd was good enough to play for Victoria Country at under-16s and under-18s level, and won a gold medal at the national championships. He later played for the North Ballarat Rebels in the TAC Cup. Lloyd was drafted by the Swans in the 2013 Rookie Draft. He secured a premiership medallion playing in the NEAFL for the club's reserves in 2013 and was named in the NEAFL team of the year.

In April 2014, Lloyd was elevated from the Swans' rookie list and made his AFL debut against Fremantle. On 18 August, he received the round 21 nomination for the AFL Rising Star Award. On 27 September, he participated in the 2014 AFL Grand Final, a match the Swans lost 137–74 to Hawthorn. Two years later, he participated in the 2016 AFL Grand Final, a match the Swans lost 89–67 to the Western Bulldogs.

From 2016-2019, he has become one of the competition's most consistent performers from half-back, placing in the top ten in the AFL for kicks in each of these four seasons. In 2017 he was runner-up in the Bob Skilton Medal, capping his rise by winning the award twice in 2018 and 2020, along with earning recognition in the 40-man All-Australian squad in 2018. Also in 2018, he became the fastest Sydney Swans player and equal-3rd fastest in VFL/AFL history to reach 100 games, owing to his impressive consistency and durability. Following speculation linking him with a move to the Gold Coast Suns, he re-signed with the Swans for a further four seasons in September 2018.

In February 2020, he represented Victoria in the AFL State of Origin for Bushfire Relief.

On August 29, 2020, Jake became the fastest Sydney Swan to reach 150 AFL games. Lloyd brought up the milestone in a 26-point loss to Port Adelaide at the Adelaide Oval. It was an incredible achievement for the 26-year-old, particularly after a humble start to his AFL career.

Statistics
Updated to the end of the 2022 season.

|-
| 2013 ||  || 44
| 0 || — || — || — || — || — || — || — || — || — || — || — || — || — || — || 0
|-
| 2014 ||  || 44
| 21 || 8 || 5 || 163 || 157 || 320 || 90 || 57 || 0.4 || 0.2 || 7.8 || 7.5 || 15.2 || 4.3 || 2.7 || 0
|-
| 2015 ||  || 44
| 22 || 3 || 4 || 248 || 197 || 445 || 96 || 49 || 0.1 || 0.2 || 11.3 || 9.0 || 20.2 || 4.4 || 2.2 || 0
|-
| 2016 ||  || 44
| 26 || 6 || 3 || 390 || 244 || 634 || 105 || 59 || 0.2 || 0.1 || 15.0 || 9.4 || 24.4 || 4.0 || 2.3 || 0
|-
| 2017 ||  || 44
| 23 || 6 || 4 || 370 || 227 || 597 || 136 || 34 || 0.2 || 0.1 || 16.0 || 9.8 || 25.9 || 5.9 || 1.4 || 2
|-
| 2018 ||  || 44
| 23 || 3 || 3 || 420 || 219 || 639 || 149 || 37 || 0.1 || 0.1 ||  bgcolor=CAE1FF | 18.3† || 9.5 || 27.7 || 6.4 || 1.6 || 6
|-
| 2019 ||  || 44
| 22 || 3 || 4 || 431 || 246 || 676 || 137 || 37 || 0.1 || 0.1 || 19.5 || 11.1 || 30.7 || 6.2 || 1.6 || 3
|-
| 2020 ||  || 44
| 17 || 1 || 0 || 284 || 155 || 439 || 81 || 38 || 0.0 || 0.0 ||  bgcolor=CAE1FF | 16.7†  || 9.1 || 25.8 || 4.7 || 2.2 || 3
|-
| 2021 ||  || 44
| 22 || 1 || 1 || 404 || 210 || 614 || 124 || 40 || 0.0 || 0.0 || 18.4 || 9.6 || 27.9 || 5.6 || 1.8 || 2
|-
| 2022 ||  || 44
| 24 || 2 || 0 || 385 || 185 || 570 || 143 || 56 || 0.1 || 0.0 || 16.0 || 7.7 || 23.8 || 6.0 || 2.3 || 1
|- class=sortbottom
! colspan=3 | Career
! 200 !! 33 !! 24 !! 3095 !! 1840 !! 4935 !! 1061 !! 406 !! 0.2 !! 0.1 !! 15.5 !! 9.2 !! 24.7 !! 5.3 !! 2.0 !! 17
|}

Notes

Honours and achievements
Team
 2× McClelland Trophy: 2014, 2016

Individual
 2× Bob Skilton Medal: 2018, 2020
 Victoria representative honours in State of Origin for Bushfire Relief Match: 2020
 AFL Rising Star nominee: 2014 (round 21)

References

External links

1993 births
Living people
Sydney Swans players
Place of birth missing (living people)
Greater Western Victoria Rebels players
Australian rules footballers from Victoria (Australia)
North Ballarat Football Club players
Bob Skilton Medal winners